The Archer Artillery System, or Archer – FH77BW L52, or Artillerisystem 08 is a Swedish self-propelled gun system. The main piece of the system is a fully automated 155 mm/L52 gun howitzer and a M151 Protector remote controlled weapon station mounted on a modified 6×6 chassis of the Volvo A30D all-terrain articulated hauler. The crew and engine compartment is armoured and the cab is fitted with bullet and fragmentation-resistant windows. The system also includes an ammunition resupply vehicle, a support vehicle, BONUS submunitions and M982 Excalibur guided projectiles.

Development
The project began in 1995 as earlier studies for a self-propelled system based on the existing FH 77 howitzer. Further test systems received the designation FH 77BD and FH 77BW. By 2004, two prototypes had been ordered based on a lengthened version of the FH 77B mounted on a modified Volvo Construction Equipment A30D articulated haul truck (6x6). In 2008, Sweden ordered a first batch of seven units, while Norway ordered one. In August 2009, Norway and Sweden ordered 24 Archers each, in a cooperative deal.

The howitzer was developed for the Swedish armed forces following a contract awarded to Bofors (now BAE Systems Bofors) in 2003 by Försvarets Materielverk (FMV), the Swedish defence acquisition agency to build two demonstrator howitzers. The prototype FH77 BW L52 self-propelled howitzers entered firing trials in Sweden in 2005 and 2006. In September 2006, the FMV placed a contract for detailed design work on Archer and, in January 2007, a contract for the next development phase. The Swedish Army had a requirement for 24 systems (two battalions). In September 2008, the Swedish government approved the final development and procurement of the Archer artillery system.

In November 2008, Sweden and Norway signed a co-operative agreement for the development of the Archer system and, in January 2009, awarded BAE Systems a contract to complete development of the artillery system with the exception of the remote weapon system which is made by Kongsberg Defence & Aerospace. A final prototype was scheduled for completion by September 2009, which was expected to be followed by a contract for 48 systems – 24 for Sweden and 24 for Norway. Archer was planned to enter service in 2011 but was delayed until October 2013. This was because of unforeseen technical problems.

The Swedish Army received its first four pre-serial production FH-77 BW L52 Archer systems on 23 September 2013, and the first guns finally entered service on 1 February 2016.

The Norwegian government withdrew from the project in December 2013.

In 2019, a new configuration of the Archer, with the howitzer mounted on a RMMV HX2 8×8 tactical truck, was revealed. Sweden had ordered a number of HX2 trucks in 2014, with deliveries commencing in 2017. On January 23, 2020, Janes reported that BAE Systems Bofors had begun trials for the HX2 variant.

Vehicle platform
The vehicle platform is a modification of the Volvo A30D 6×6 articulated all-terrain hauler vehicle. Operators control the entire gun system in any weather from the safety of the armored vehicle cabin which is fitted with bullet and fragmentation-proof windows. The cabin seats up to four personnel. The howitzer is operated by three or four crew but can be run by a single operator.
The system also includes a munition carrier consisting of a removable, modified standard container mounted on a ballistic-proofed all-terrain lorry. The unit cost is approximately $4,500,000.

Ammunition

The vehicle carries 21 155mm projectiles in the fully automatic magazine. Reloading the magazine from the accompanying munitions carrier takes about 10 minutes using the purpose-built lifting device. The howitzer can use NATO modular charges or Bofors Uniflex 2 modular charges. The Uniflex 2IM modular charge system consists of two sizes of combustible charge cases; one full-size and one half-size case, both filled with the same type of insensitive guanylurea dinitramide (GuDN) propellant. The modular charge system allows several increments of charge to be available and increases the system's multiple rounds simultaneous impact (MRSI) capability and good range overlap between the increments. The Excalibur shell is corrected in flight towards a pre-programmed trajectory by a GPS guidance system.
For armoured vehicles, the Bofors 155 Bonus is used.

Deployment
The system is designed for high strategic, operational and tactical mobility. A large hydraulically operated stabilizer is installed in the rear of the chassis and is lowered with the vehicle in the selected firing position. The gun elevation and traverse ranges are -1° to +70° vertically and −85° to +85° horizontally. The initial deployment time and the redeployment times less than 30 seconds. The system provides precision strike and high sustained firepower for support and for deep firing operations with more than 25 t of ammunition per gun and 24-hour operation. The howitzer has a continuous fire rate of 75 rounds per hour, an intensive fire rate of 20 rounds (i.e., a full magazine) in 2.5 minutes (effective rate, 480 per hour), and a salvo fire rate of three rounds in 15 seconds (effective rate, 720 per hour). The MRSI capability, multiple round simultaneous impact, is up to 6 rounds.

General characteristics

Length: 14.1 meters
Width: 3.0 meters
Height: 3.3 meters without the Protector mounted, 3.9 meters with.
Weight: 30 metric tons (30 Mg)
Speed: 65 km/h
Range: 500 km
Crew: 3-4 (commander, driver, 1-2 operators) but in case of emergencies a driver and a gunner can operate the vehicle.
Armament: 155-mm/L52 gun howitzer, Kongsberg Protector remote weapon system.
Rate of fire: 8–9 rounds/min in Multiple round simultaneous impact-mode, which means that several shells are fired in succession with different trajectories so they hit the target simultaneously.
Weapon range (main gun): 30 km with standard shells, 40 km with base bleed, in excess of 50 km with Excalibur
Protection level of armour: 7.62 mm armour-piercing rounds, mines up to 6 kg (Level 2 STANAG 4569)
Emergency driving: all wheels – emergency driving equipment (Hutchinson AMVFI) makes it possible to drive with all wheels punctured; it also provides greater protection if the vehicle hits a blast-pressure mine; the same system is used on the Finnish APC Pasi.

Operators

Current operators 
 Swedish Army - 26 owned as of the 16th of March 2023.
Platform Volvo A30D: 24 in service, 2 in storage.  The Swedish Army ordered 24 Archer systems in 2009. An additional order for the 24 systems originally bought by Norway was placed in 2016.BAE Systems Bofors delivered 48 Archer to the Royal Swedish Artillery Regiment (9th Artillery regiment) between 2013 and 2022. On the 16th of March 2023, the Swedish Government announced that 24 of the systems were in service, 24 in storage. And among those, 14 are to be sold and transferred to the Britsh Army in March 2023, and 8 will be transferred to Ukraine.
Platform Rheinmetall HX2 8x8: 24 planned.  The Swedish Defense Materiel Administration (FMV, Försvarets materielverk), signed a letter of intent to purchase 24 Archer systems in June 2022. Its intention was to equip a third artillery battalion. by 2025.

Future operators 
  Ukrainian Army - On 16 March 2023, the Swedish government announced that it will send 8 Archer artillery systems to the Ukrainian armed forces. 
  British Army - The Archer system is also one of the contenders for the British Army's future artillery, as it is participating in the Mobile Fires Platform (MFP) program to replace the AS-90. On 16 March 2023, the Swedish Goverment asked for permission from the Riksdag to sell 14 Archer artillery systems to the British Army as an interim replacement. Ownership of the systems will be transferred during March 2023, with them being fully operational by the following April.

Cancelled orders
 Norwegian Army – 24 ordered for Royal Norwegian Artillery Battalion.  The order was canceled in December 2013 for not meeting needs within the time remaining available. Norway later chose to purchase the K9 Thunder in December 2017.

Potential operators 
 The US Army has shown interest in the Archer system. The system was displayed in Camp Atterbury in November 2021. Deputy chief of staff for programs, lieutenant general Erik Peterson, visited Sweden to inspect the system in April 2022.
 BAE Systems Bofors announced in June 22 that Switzerland shortlisted the Archer for the final round of its Future Artillery System competition "Artillerie Wirkplattform und Wirkmittel 2026". The version selected is the one based on the Rheinmetall HX2 8x8.  The 11 of August 2022, the Federal Department of Defence confirmed this information and announced that the Archer will be in competition against the RCH 155 Artillery Gun Module. KMW who manufactures the AGM offers two versions, one based on the Boxer platform, and one based on the Piranha IV .

See also

ATMOS 2000
A-222 Bereg
2S22 Bohdana
CAESAR
DANA
G6 Rhino
AHS Kryl
Nora B-52
PCL-09
PCL-161
PCL-181
PLL-09
Type 19 
ZUZANA

Footnotes

References

External links

Swedish Defence Materiel Administration: ARCHER – Artillery system
 Swedish Artillery Regiment
BAE Systems in Sweden
 A unique Forestry carrier conversion Article in mil.se
Video links

Self-propelled artillery of Sweden
Field artillery
Bofors
155 mm artillery
Wheeled self-propelled howitzers
Military vehicles introduced in the 2010s